Sé (Portuguese for "Episcopal see") is a civil parish in the municipality of Funchal, on the island of Madeira, Portugal. It includes the historical centre of Funchal. The population in 2011 was 2,656, in an area of 3.82 km². Its administrative authority includes the distant, uninhabited Savage Islands, with an area of 2.73 km².

References 

Parishes of Funchal